Primm Valley Resort & Casino (formerly Primadonna Resort & Casino) is a hotel and casino located in Primm, Nevada. It is one of the Primm Valley Resorts, owned and operated by Affinity Gaming. It is named after the Primm family, benefactors of the hotel and casino properties by Ernest and Gary Primm.

The hotel offers 624 rooms and suites. The casino has  of gaming space, with 773 slot machines, 26 table games, and a William Hill race and sportsbook. The resort is adjacent to the Prizm Outlets shopping centre.

Free shuttle buses operate between the Primm Valley Resort and Primm's other hotels, Whiskey Pete's and Buffalo Bill's. Primm Valley Resort has an exhibit located between the adjacent Prizm Outlets featuring the bullet-riddled car that Bonnie and Clyde were driving when they were killed.

History
Built by Primadonna Casino Resorts and opened in 1990 as Primadonna Resort & Casino.

The Fashion Outlets were added as a part of the Primadonna Resort & Casino in 1998.

On October 31, 2006, MGM Mirage announced plans to sell the Primm Valley Casino Resorts, which includes the Primm Valley Resort & Casino, to Herbst Gaming for $400 million. The sign in front of the resort had been renamed from Primm Valley Resort and Casino to Terrible's Resort and Casino in 2007 and was renamed back as Primm Valley Resort and Casino in 2011.

As of March 23, 2009, the Herbst family relinquished control of the Terrible's Primm Valley Casino Resort, along with both other properties, to their lenders.

References

External links
 

Casinos in Primm, Nevada
Hotels in Primm, Nevada
Resorts in Nevada
UniTrak people movers
Affinity Gaming
Casino hotels